Elizabeth Ann Mrazik Cleaver (February 7, 1939 – July 27, 1985) was a Canadian illustrator and writer of children's books. For her contribution as a children's illustrator she was a highly commended runner-up for the biennial, international Hans Christian Andersen Award in 1972.

Two of her books The Wind Has Wings: Poems from Canada and The Loon's Necklace were recognized with the Amelia Frances Howard-Gibbon Illustrator's Award for the outstanding illustrations in Canadian children's literature.  Shortly before her death, the Library and Archives of Canada acquired the original illustrations for eleven of Cleaver's thirteen books so that they would be preserved for future generations. Original artwork was also donated to the Toronto Public Library's Osborne Collection of Early Children's Books. An award for illustrators of Canadian children's literature Elizabeth Mrazik-Cleaver Canadian Picture Book Award is named in her honor.

Awards
1971 Amelia Frances Howard-Gibbon Illustrator's Award for The Wind Has Wings: Poems from Canada
1972 Hans Christian Andersen Certificate of Honor from IBBY (International Board on Books for Young People) for The Wind Has Wings: Poems from Canada, The Mountain Goats of Temlaham, and How Summer Came to Canada
1974 Canadian Library Association Book of the Year for Children Award  for The Miraculous Hind
1978 Amelia Frances Howard-Gibbon Award for The Loon's Necklace
1980 Canada Council Children's Literature Prize, English language, illustration, for Petrouchka
1982 Hans Christian Andersen Certificate of Honour from IBBY (International Board on Books for Young People) for Petrouchka

See also

References

External links
 Archives of Elizabeth Cleaver (Elizabeth Cleaver fonds, R11720) are held at Library and Archives Canada
 

1939 births
1985 deaths
Anglophone Quebec people
Canadian children's writers
Canadian children's book illustrators
Canadian women novelists
Canadian women children's writers
Writers from Montreal
20th-century Canadian novelists
20th-century Canadian women writers